Junius Brutus is a 1734 tragedy by the British writer William Duncombe. It was one of a number of plays based on the life of the Roman Republican Lucius Junius Brutus

The original Drury Lane cast included John Mills as Junius Brutus, Edward Berry as Valeius Publicola, William Milward as Titus, William Mills as Caelius, Theophilus Cibber as Messala, Richard Winstone as Silvus and Mary Heron as Lucia and Hannah Pritchard as Hortensia.

References

Bibliography
 Burling, William J. A Checklist of New Plays and Entertainments on the London Stage, 1700-1737. Fairleigh Dickinson Univ Press, 1992.
 Ellison, Julie. Cato's Tears and the Making of Anglo-American Emotion. University of Chicago Press, 1999.

1734 plays
British plays
West End plays
Tragedy plays